Jagged Island may refer to:

 Jagged Island (Graham Land)
 Jagged Island (South Shetland Islands)